The 2015 Cheez-It 355 at The Glen was a NASCAR Sprint Cup Series race held on August 9, 2015 at Watkins Glen International in Watkins Glen, New York. Contested over 90 laps on the 2.45 mile (3.94 km) road course, it was the 22nd race of the 2015 NASCAR Sprint Cup Series season. Joey Logano won the race, his second of the season. Kyle Busch finished second. Kevin Harvick finished third. Matt Kenseth and Kurt Busch rounded out the top five.

A. J. Allmendinger won the pole for the race and led 21 laps on his way to a 24th-place finish. Kevin Harvick lead a race high of 29 laps on his way to a third-place finish. The race had eight lead changes among eight different drivers, five cautions for 16 laps and one red flag for nine minutes and three seconds.

This was the tenth career victory for Joey Logano, second of the season, first at Watkins Glen and first at the track for Team Penske. The win brought Logano to within 42–points of Kevin Harvick in the points standings. Despite being the winning manufacturer, Ford left Watkins Glen trailing Chevrolet by 70–points in the manufacturer standings.

The Cheez-It 355 at The Glen was carried by NBC Sports on the cable/satellite NBCSN network for the American television audience. The radio broadcast for the race was carried by the Motor Racing Network and Sirius XM NASCAR Radio.

Report

Background

Watkins Glen International, nicknamed "The Glen", is an automobile race track located in Watkins Glen, New York, at the southern tip of Seneca Lake. The sports car racing facility is owned by the International Speedway Corporation. It was long known around the world as the home of the United States Grand Prix, which it hosted for 20 consecutive years (1961–1980) but since 1948, it has been home to road racing of nearly every class, such as Formula One, the World Sportscar Championship, Trans-Am, Can-Am, the NASCAR Sprint Cup Series, the International Motor Sports Association and the Verizon IndyCar Series. Initially, public roads in the village were used for the race course. In 1956, a permanent circuit for the race was built. In 1968, the race was extended to six hours, earning the nickname "6 Hours of Watkins Glen". The circuit's current layout has more/less been the same since 1971, although a chicane was installed at the uphill esses in 1975 to slow cars through these corners, where there was a fatality during practice at the 1973 United States Grand Prix. The chicane was removed in 1985, but another chicane called the "Inner Loop" was installed in 1992 after a fatal accident during the previous year's NASCAR Winston Cup event. The circuit is known as the Mecca of North American road racing and is a very popular venue among fans and drivers.

Kevin Harvick entered Watkins Glen with a 46–point lead over Joey Logano. Dale Earnhardt Jr. entered 63 back. Jimmie Johnson entered 67 back. Martin Truex Jr. entered 86 back.

Entry list
The entry list for the Cheez-It 355 at The Glen was released on Monday, August 3 at 9:00 a.m. Eastern time. Forty-four cars were entered for the race. All but the No. 95 Leavine Family Racing Ford, driven by Michael McDowell, were entered the previous week's race at Pocono. The three driver changes for this race were Chris Buescher, making his sixth Sprint Cup Series start and first since Talladega in May, Boris Said – attempting to start the race in the No. 32 Go FAS Racing Ford – and T. J. Bell – making his first Cup Series start since the 2012 season – driving the No. 62 Premium Motorsports Chevrolet.

Practice

First practice

Final practice

Qualifying

"Track position is critical around here," Allmendinger said. "Everybody is so close, it's tough to pass, you start beating and banging on each other, and your fenders get torn up. So this is a good start, and strategy plays a lot in this race - fuel mileage and everything. I don’t know if I’ll sleep any better tonight, but I’ll be ready for Sunday." "That was all I had and I’m content with it," said Tony Stewart after qualifying third for his first race at Watkins Glen since 2012. "Three good weeks of qualifying make me happy, at three different tracks with three different packages. That's an awesome way to start the weekend." "Our laps weren’t great, we were just OK," said Kyle Busch after qualifying eighth. "We were way too loose and didn’t have the balance we needed to get the speed out of it for some of the corners."

Qualifying results

Race

First half

Start
The race was scheduled to start at 2:18 p.m., but started at 2:23 p.m. when A. J. Allmendinger led the field to the green flag. On lap 3, Jimmie Johnson overshot the entrance to the inner loop and was forced to come to a complete stop before continuing. As a result, he fell from ninth to 22nd. On lap 10, Aric Almirola got loose and spun out in turn 1. Paul Menard, who took the outside line, made minor contact with him. Both drivers continued on and the race remained green. Outside polesitter Martin Truex Jr. passed Allmendinger in turn 11 to take the lead on lap 22. That same lap, Kevin Harvick climbed his way to second, putting Allmendinger in third-place. Jeff Gordon pitted from eighth on lap 24. Debris on the backstretch brought out the first caution of the race on lap 26. The debris came from Greg Biffle's car. Cole Whitt opted not to pit and assumed the lead Denny Hamlin and Jimmie Johnson were tagged for speeding on pit road and restarted the race from the tail-end of the field.

Second quarter
The race restarted on lap 29. Brad Keselowski passed Whitt in turn 1 to take the lead. On the same lap, the hood of Denny Hamlin's car flew up. He didn't pit that lap and was black flagged for not pitting to put the hood down. As he pulled off pit road, another piece of debris flew off his car and landed in the esses. This brought out the second caution of the race on lap 32.

The race restarted on lap 36. Justin Allgaier got loose and spun out exiting turn 1, but the race remained green. Kyle Larson got loose and made contact with Austin Dillon on lap 42. Both went spinning in turn, but the race remained green. Debris on the backstretch brought out the third caution of the race on lap 46.

Second half

Halfway
The race restarted on lap 50. An accordion wreck on the front stretch brought out the fourth caution of the race. The amount of fluid on the front stretch brought out the red flag. Allmendinger's car lost power and came to a stop past turn 10. After nine minutes and three seconds, the red flag was withdrawn and the race continued under caution.

The race restarted on lap 55. Kyle Busch tapped Keselowski going into turn 10 and took the lead on lap 57. The fifth caution of the race flew on lap 57 when Tony Stewart came to a stop just before reaching the inner loop. He jumped onto the radio and said that something broke in the drive-train. In an unrelated incident, Johnson spun out in turn 5. Matt Kenseth opted not to pit and assumed the lead, dropping Busch back to 21st.

The race restarted on lap 61. Harvick passed Kenseth going up turn 2 to take the lead. Martin Truex Jr. got out of the groove in turn 11 and made an unscheduled stop with 22 laps to go. The culprit was a flat left-front tire.

Final ten laps

Harvick was still leading with ten laps to go with no guarantee of making the finish on his fuel load. Allmendinger was the first to run out as he pitted from the top ten with seven laps to go. Harvick ran out of fuel on the final lap and was passed by Logano going into turn 11 who took the checkered flag.

Post-race

Driver comments
“I was running down Harvick there for a little bit and once I got close to him he started to pick up his pace a little bit, which was good because I needed him to run out of gas,” Logano said. “I started to catch him a little bit and I drove into one too hard and started to wheel hop. I just about lost it and at that point you just hope he runs out of gas, which he did in the last corner. It makes up for last week. We lost the race last week the same way, so it makes up for it to get it this week.” “I had a chance,” Kyle Busch said after finishing second. “I could’ve went up there, I could’ve raced the 22, I could’ve passed him. I felt like I was better than he was, but my crew chief called in scared on the fuel situation from last week and I don’t blame him. We definitely didn’t want to run out again. We wanted to make sure we could be there at the end.” “We ran pretty good with just the way the fuel strategy worked out, we had to save a lot battling with Kevin (Harvick)," Kenseth said. "I thought (Joey Logano) and (Kyle Busch) were going to go right by me and we actually had a lot of car left."

Race results

Race statistics
8 lead changes among 8 different drivers
5 cautions for 16 laps; 1 red flag for 9 minutes, 3 seconds
Time of race: 2 hours, 24 minute, 43 seconds
Average speed: 
Joey Logano took home $263,723 in winnings

Race awards
 Coors Light Pole Award: A. J. Allmendinger (1:08.993)
 3M Lap Leader: Kevin Harvick (29 laps)
 American Ethanol Green Flag Restart Award: Brad Keselowski
 Duralast Brakes "Bake In The Race" Award: Kevin Harvick
 Freescale "Wide Open": Kurt Busch
 Ingersoll Rand Power Move: Aric Almirola (4 positions)
 MAHLE Clevite Engine Builder of the Race: Hendrick Engines #4
 Mobil 1 Driver of the Race: Kevin Harvick (132.7 driver rating)
 Moog Steering and Suspension Problem Solver of The Race: Clint Bowyer (crew chief Billy Scott (–0.096 seconds))
 NASCAR Sprint Cup Leader Bonus: No winner: rolls over to $190,000 at next event
 Sherwin-Williams Fastest Lap: A. J. Allmendinger (Lap 5, 1:11.073)
 Sunoco Rookie of The Race: Matt DiBenedetto

Media

Television
NBC Sports covered the race on the television side. Rick Allen, Jeff Burton and Steve Letarte had the call in the booth for the race. Dave Burns, Mike Massaro, Marty Snider and Kelli Stavast handled pit road on the television side.

Radio
MRN had the radio call for the race, which was simulcast on Sirius XM NASCAR Radio. Joe Moore, Jeff Striegle and two–time Watkins Glen winner Rusty Wallace called the race from the booth when the field was racing down the front stretch. Dave Moody called the race from a scaffold outside of the esses when the field was racing through turn 1 and up the esses of turns 2, 3 and 4. Mike Bagley called the race from a scaffold outside of the outer loop when the field was racing up the back straight, through the inner loop and down turn 5. Kurt Becker called the race from a spotter stand outside of the short chute when the field was racing down the short chute and rounding turns 10 and 11. Winston Kelley, Alex Hayden and Steve Post worked pit road for MRN.

Standings after the race

Drivers' Championship standings

Manufacturers' Championship standings

Note: Only the first sixteen positions are included for the driver standings.

References

Cheez-It 355 at The Glen
Cheez-It 355 at The Glen
NASCAR races at Watkins Glen International